Degersheim railway station is a railway station in Degersheim, in the Swiss canton of St. Gallen. It is an intermediate station on the Bodensee–Toggenburg railway and is served by local trains only.

Services 
Degersheim is served by two services of the St. Gallen S-Bahn:

 : hourly service over the Bodensee–Toggenburg railway between Nesslau-Neu St. Johann and Altstätten SG.
 : hourly service over the Bodensee–Toggenburg railway via Sargans (circular operation).

References

External links 
 
 Degersheim station on SBB

Railway stations in the canton of St. Gallen
Südostbahn stations